Felipe Berriozábal (born August 23, 1829, in Zacatecas, Zacatecas – died January 9, 1900, in Mexico City) was a Mexican politician, engineer and military leader. He participated in the Reform War and in the fight against French Intervention in Mexico. He was a member of president Benito Juárez's cabinet, serving as Secretary of War and Secretary of Marine, Berriozábal also served during Porfirio Díaz's government. He was a commander of the Mexican Army and member of the Chamber of Deputies. His remains were buried at the Panteón de Dolores in Mexico City, in the Rotunda of Illustrious Persons on January 12, 1900; shortly after his death.

Political life 
Berriozábal was named Secretary of War in 1865 under Benito Juarez's term. He was also elected governor for Mexico State and Michoacan. By the end of the 19th century he was appointed Ministry of Government by Porfirio Díaz. He finally was chosen to be Ministry of War. He died on January 9, 1900, and his remains rest at Rotunda of Illustrious Persons monument, located in Panteón de Dolores, Mexico City. A municipality was named after him, Coacalco de Berriozábal, in State of Mexico.

References 

1829 births
1900 deaths
Mexican engineers
Mexican generals
People from Zacatecas City
Governors of Michoacán
Governors of the State of Mexico
Members of the Chamber of Deputies (Mexico)